FIFA Online 4 is a free-to-play massively multiplayer online football game developed by EA Spearhead and published by Nexon. It was announced on 2 November 2017, and released on 17 May 2018 in South Korea. It was released in China, on 11 June, Thailand 12 June, and Vietnam 14 June 2018.

Development
In December 2017, the first closed beta test was launched, and plenty have been held. In South Korea, it was released into open beta on 17 May 2018. 
In Vietnam closed beta test started on 22 March 2018

FIFA Online 4 M
In July 2018, FIFA Online 4 M was released in Korea for iOS and Android. It is a mobile version and sequel to FIFA Online 3 M. It was later released in November 2018 in Vietnam and Thailand.

FIFA license
With the announcement that FIFA would no longer be licensing its name and brand to EA, Nexon assured fans that the end of the partnership would not affect the service of the game on both PC and mobile.

Gameplay
The game engine is not part of the Frostbite engine series because of hardware requirements. FIFA Online 4 has animations and other components from FIFA 18. The gameplay and AI engine are from FIFA 17.

The game allows players to play regular matches with 2v2 or 3v3 matches like the main series as well as the Ultimate Team feature seen in other games. The game allows the ability to buy players from a marketplace and help build their stats by purchasing items.

Features

2018 FIFA World Cup Russia
On 24 May 2018, the "World Cup Mode" was announced to be released on 31 May 2018. Two new game modes were introduced, Vs Com FIFA World Cup and Vs User 16 Tournaments. The group stage mode is against computer, while the knockout stage mode are against other players.

Reception
As of 2022, FIFA Online 4 is the 5th most popular esport in South Korea.

References

External links
Nexon FIFA Online 4 Official Website
Tencent FIFA Online 4 China Official Website
Garena FIFA Online 4 Vietnam Official Website
Garena FIFA Online 4 Thailand Official Website

2018 video games
Android (operating system) games
IOS games
Online 4
FIFA Online
EA Sports games
Massively multiplayer online games
Video games developed in South Korea
Windows games
Frostbite (game engine) games
Garena games